The Michigan Emmy Awards is a chapter of the National Academy of Television Arts & Sciences (MI-NATAS) The Southfield, Michigan division was founded in 1980. In addition to granting the Michigan Emmy Awards, this division awards scholarships, honors industry veterans at the Silver Circle Celebration, conducts National Student Television Awards of Excellence, has a free research and a nationwide job bank. The chapter also participates in judging Emmy entries at the regional and national levels.

Board of governors

The Board of Governors is a working board, which works together collaboratively to ensure they are providing for the best interests of the membership.

References

Regional Emmy Awards
Awards established in 1980
1980 establishments in Michigan